Alifu, the Prince/ss is a 2017 Taiwanese drama film directed by Wang Yu-lin. It premiered at the 30th Tokyo International Film Festival.

Premise
In one of three stories in the film, Alifu is a 25-year-old man who works at a salon in the city. However, as the only son of the chief of the Paiwan, he is torn between realizing his dream of becoming a woman and inheriting the chief position handed down by his father.

Cast
 Utjung Tjakivalid as Alifu	 
 Chao Yi-lan as Li Pei-zhen
 Wu Pong-fong as Wu 
 Bamboo Chen as Sherry 
 Cheng Jen-shuo as Chris
 Angie Wang as Angie 
 Ara Kimbo as Chief Dakanao
 Matt Fleming as Jonathan

Awards and nominations

References

External links

2017 films
Taiwanese-language films
Taiwanese LGBT-related films
2017 LGBT-related films
LGBT-related drama films
Films about trans women
Taiwanese drama films
2017 drama films
2010s Mandarin-language films